Ramachandra Ulaka was an Indian politician. He was elected to the Lok Sabha, lower house of the Parliament of India from Koraput in Odisha as a member of the Indian National Congress.He had 3 wives and his sons Saptagiri Sankar Ulaka and  Siba Sankar Ulaka are also in politics.

References

External links
Official Biographical Sketch in Lok Sabha Website

Lok Sabha members from Odisha
India MPs 1967–1970
India MPs 1962–1967
1934 births
2011 deaths
Indian National Congress politicians from Odisha